Tianjin preserved vegetable (also called tung tsai, Tientsin preserved vegetable or Tianjin preserved cabbage) is a type of pickled Chinese cabbage originating in Tianjin, China. It consists of finely chopped Tianjin cabbage (箭杆菜; a variety of Chinese cabbage with an elongated shape) and salt. Garlic is also generally added in the pickling process, although it is omitted in versions prepared for consumption by members of certain Chinese Buddhist sects, who practice strict Buddhist vegetarianism and do not consume garlic or other spicy foods. This pickled vegetable is used to flavor soups, stir-fries or stewed dishes.

Tianjin preserved vegetable is commercially available in earthenware crocks or clear plastic packages.

See also

References

Preserved Vegetable
Plant-based fermented foods
Chinese cuisine
Chinese pickles
Indonesian cuisine
Indonesian pickles
Cabbage dishes